Polyommatus atlantica, the Atlas blue, is a butterfly in the family Lycaenidae. It was described by Henry John Elwes in 1905. It is found in North Africa.

The larvae feed on Anthyllis vulneraria.

It has the highest number of chromosomes in the non-polyploid eukaryotic organisms (2n = circa 448–452.)

Subspecies
Polyommatus atlantica weissi (Morocco: High Atlas)
Polyommatus atlantica weissi (Dujardin, 1977) (Morocco: Middle Atlas)
Polyommatus atlantica barraguei Dujardin, 1977 (Algeria: Djurdjura, Aures Mountains)

References

Butterflies described in 1956
Polyommatus
Butterflies of Africa
Taxobox binomials not recognized by IUCN